Peter Joseph Vermes (born November 21, 1966) is an American professional soccer coach and former player. He is currently the head coach of Sporting Kansas City in Major League Soccer.

Entering the 2023 MLS season, Vermes is currently the longest-tenured head coach in MLS and has won four major trophies as a manager, the second most of all active coaches in MLS.

As a player, Vermes spent several seasons playing in Hungary, the Netherlands, before establishing himself as a defender in Major League Soccer, playing for MetroStars, Colorado Rapids and the Kansas City Wizards.
Vermes was also a regular member of the United States national team throughout the 1990s, and represented his country at the 1988 Summer Olympics, the 1990 FIFA World Cup and the 1991 CONCACAF Gold Cup.

On April 4, 2013, Vermes was elected to the U.S. Soccer Hall of Fame.

Youth and college
Vermes was born in Willingboro, New Jersey. He grew up in Delran Township, New Jersey and played high school soccer at Delran High School.  He graduated in 1984, having scored 109 goals. In 1999, he was named by The Star-Ledger as one of the top ten New Jersey high school soccer players of the 1980s.

Vermes played his first year in college on the men's soccer team at Loyola College in Maryland under head coach Bill Sento. Vermes then transferred and played three years of college soccer at Rutgers University, from 1985 to 1987.  In his final season, Vermes scored 21 goals and 10 assists for the team, finishing a first-team All-American, as well as runner-up for the National Player of the Year Award.  During that season, Vermes led Rutgers to their first victory in the NCAA Tournament in 26 years, scoring the winning goal in a contest against Seton Hall University.

Playing career

Professional
After graduating, Vermes went to Europe, where he played with Rába ETO FC of Hungary in 1989 and Volendam of the Dutch Eredivisie in 1990.  In May 1991, Vermes returned to the United States and played three games, scoring a single goal against the Tampa Bay Rowdies of the American Professional Soccer League.  He then moved to Spain where he played for Spanish Second Division club Figueres from 1991 to 1995.

Like many American players, Vermes returned to the United States to join the recently founded domestic league Major League Soccer. In January 1995, he signed with the new league that would not begin league play until 1996.  Therefore, MLS loaned Vermes to the New York Fever of the USISL where he played 25 games, scoring 16 goals in the 1995 season.  In 1996, Vermes was drafted by the New York/New Jersey MetroStars in the third round of the MLS Inaugural Draft (29th overall) and captained the team in its first season.  Although he played the most minutes of any MetroStar that year, the MetroStars traded Vermes on February 3, 1997, to the Colorado Rapids for Kerry Zavagnin.  Vermes would play three years for the Rapids before being traded again, this time to the Kansas City Wizards with Matt McKeon for Scott Vermillion and a player allocation.

With the Wizards, Vermes helped the Wizards finish the season first in the league with a 16–7–9 record, having allowed only 29 goals in 32 games, and eventually winning the MLS Cup.  Vermes was recognized as the MLS Defender of the Year, while his teammate Tony Meola won both the MLS Goalkeeper of the Year and MLS MVP awards.  Vermes played two more seasons with the Wizards, struggling with injuries but playing every game he was healthy for, before announcing his retirement at the end of the 2002 season.

International
Vermes received his first cap May 14, 1988, against Colombia, and would in all receive 66 caps for the team, playing in the 1988 Olympics, the 1990 World Cup and the 1991 CONCACAF Gold Cup. In the 1990 World Cup, he nearly bagged a goal against Italy with a shot against Italian goalkeeper Walter Zenga. After seeing his playing time wane with the team in late 1993 and early 1994, Vermes was one of the final cuts from the 1994 U.S. World Cup team. He later said he thought that his outspoken comments had doomed him politically.  A forward early in his career, his performance in defense in MLS led to his comeback to the National team in that position after years of absence, but he was cut again from the U.S. roster in January 1998.

Vermes was named the 1988 U.S. Soccer Athlete of the Year and U.S. Olympic Player of the Year.

In 1989, he scored six goals for the U.S. Futsal team, which took third place, at the FIFA Futsal World Championship in Rotterdam, the Netherlands. He ended his futsal career with 11 caps and 7 goals.

International goals

Coaching career

Kansas City

Vermes was appointed as the technical Director for the Kansas City Wizards of Major League Soccer in  November 2006.

He was named interim coach of the Wizards on August 4, 2009, one day after predecessor Curt Onalfo was fired by the team. The team was in sixth place in the MLS Eastern Conference with a 5–6–7 record. Vermes would lead to the Wizards to a 3–7–2 record down the stretch.
Following the season, the Wizards removed the interim tag from his title.

In 2012, Vermes won his first piece of silverware as a head coach, leading the renamed Sporting Kansas City (changed from the Kansas City Wizards in 2010) to a penalty shootout win over three-time defending champions Seattle Sounders FC to win the 2012 Lamar Hunt U.S. Open Cup. The following year, Vermes led the club to the MLS Cup, where they beat Real Salt Lake, also in a penalty shoot-out. This makes him the only person to ever win the MLS Cup as both a player and a coach with the same team.

Vermes won his third trophy as Sporting KC coach when his side won the 2015 Lamar Hunt U.S. Open Cup by defeating the Philadelphia Union on penalties at Talen Energy Stadium. Two years later, Vermes added the 2017 Lamar Hunt U.S. Open Cup to his trophy haul when Sporting KC beat the New York Red Bulls 2–1 at Children's Mercy Park.

On August 4, 2018, Vermes coached his 302nd regular-season match – a 1–0 victory over the Houston Dynamo – becoming the all-time leader in games coached with one club in MLS history.

On October 3, 2020, Vermes won his 150th regular-season match, with a 2–1 victory over the Houston Dynamo, becoming only the 5th coach in MLS history to do so.

In February 2023, Vermes signed a five-year extension with Sporting Kansas City through the 2028 MLS season.

Other coaching and activities
Vermes worked as a broadcaster for the San Jose Earthquakes. Vermes serves as the technical Director of Coaching for the Blue Valley Soccer Club in Overland Park, Kansas, and was an assistant coach for the U.S. Under-20 National Team.

Personal life

Vermes's parents immigrated to the United States from Hungary as refugees during the 1956 revolution. His father, Michael, was a professional footballer for Budapest Honvéd FC and operated an indoor soccer training center in New Jersey after immigrating. Peter has two brothers and one sister.

Peter married his wife Susan, who he met in high school, in 1990. The couple have two children.

Vermes was arrested for a suspected DUI on August 24, 2010, by police in Gardner, Kansas. He accepted one year of probation and the charge was dropped. The incident was mocked by Philadelphia Union supporters during a match in September 2010, with the Sons of Ben singing the entire folk song "99 Bottles of Beer" during the team's match against Kansas City.

Coaching statistics

Honors

Player
Kansas City Wizards
MLS Cup: 2000
Supporters' Shield: 2000

Coach
Sporting Kansas City
MLS Cup: 2013
U.S. Open Cup: 2012, 2015, 2017

Individual
National Soccer Hall of Fame Inductee: 2013
U.S. Soccer Athlete of the Year: 1988
MLS Defender of the Year Award: 2000
MLS All-Star: 2000
MLS Sporting Executive of the Year: 2019

Notes

See also
 List of current MLS coaches

References

External links
 Profile at US Soccer Players
 
 

1966 births
Living people
All-American men's college soccer players
American expatriate soccer players
American Professional Soccer League players
Colorado Rapids players
Győri ETO FC players
FC Volendam players
Eredivisie players
Expatriate footballers in Hungary
Expatriate footballers in the Netherlands
Expatriate footballers in Spain
Segunda División players
Sporting Kansas City coaches
Sporting Kansas City players
Loyola Greyhounds men's soccer players
Major League Soccer coaches
Major League Soccer players
New York Red Bulls players
UE Figueres footballers
New York Fever players
Olympic soccer players of the United States
Parade High School All-Americans (boys' soccer)
Delran High School alumni
People from Delran Township, New Jersey
People from Willingboro Township, New Jersey
Sportspeople from Burlington County, New Jersey
Rutgers Scarlet Knights men's soccer players
Tampa Bay Rowdies (1975–1993) players
CONCACAF Gold Cup-winning players
Footballers at the 1988 Summer Olympics
1990 FIFA World Cup players
1991 CONCACAF Gold Cup players
1992 King Fahd Cup players
1993 Copa América players
1993 CONCACAF Gold Cup players
Association football forwards
Association football defenders
American people of Hungarian descent
American soccer players
Soccer players from New Jersey
United States men's international soccer players
American men's futsal players
Major League Soccer All-Stars
National Soccer Hall of Fame members
Nemzeti Bajnokság I players
American expatriate sportspeople in the Netherlands
American expatriate sportspeople in Hungary
American expatriate sportspeople in Spain
American soccer coaches